Holy Trinity Roman Catholic Church is a parish church in the Archdiocese of Hartford located in Hartford, Connecticut, United States. The parish was founded by Lithuanian immigrants within the 20th century. Construction of the church began in 1912.

History
Lithuanians began settling in the Hartford, Connecticut area in the 1890s. In 1894, Father Joseph Zebris, who had been celebrating Mass in Waterbury, Connecticut, began his mission in Hartford, where 20 Lithuanian families had already settled. Father Zebris, founded "The Sons of Lithuania Society" in Hartford in 1896, under the patronage of St. John the Baptist.

In June 1898, Father Zebris was appointed as pastor of a church in New Britain. During the 19th century, many Lithuanians came to the Eastern United States. About 80 immigrants settled in Hartford. Father Zebris organized a meeting for all Lithuanian Hartfordites and those from Windsor and Poquonock to discuss offering Mass on Sundays in Hartford. The immigrants held a July 4 bazaar, and from the proceeds were able to rent a large room in a building on the corner of Sheldon and Main Street. They celebrated their first Mass there on July 17, 1898.

References 

 Trumpa Hartford'o Lietuvių Kolonijos istorija. - Hartford, 1923. - 40 p.
 Auksinis Jubuliejus 1900 - 1950 Įv. Trejybės parapija. - Hartford, 1950.
 Diamond Jubilee of Holy Trinity Parish 1900 - 1975. - Hartford, 1975.
 90th Anniversary of Holi Trinity R. C. Lithuanian Parish. - Hartford, 1990.
 Centennial Jubilee of Holy Trinity Roman Catholic Lithuanian Parish 1900 - 2000. - Hartford, 2000.
 Lithuanian pioneer priest of New England
 Lithuanian Religious Life in America: A Compendium of 150 Roman Catholic Parishes and Institutions. Eastern United States -  
 Lithuanian Religious Life in America: A Compendium of 150 Roman Catholic Parishes and Institutions. Pennsylvania
 Lithuanian Religious Life in America: A Compendium of 150 Roman Catholic Parishes and Institutions. The Midwest and Beyond

Christian organizations established in 1900
Roman Catholic churches completed in 1927
Roman Catholic churches in Hartford, Connecticut
Lithuanian-American culture
Romanesque Revival church buildings in Connecticut
20th-century Roman Catholic church buildings in the United States